283 Emma is a large asteroid of the asteroid belt and the namesake of the Emma family. It was discovered by Auguste Charlois on 8 February 1889, in Nice, France. The reason for its name is unknown.

Measurements made with the IRAS observatory give a diameter of 145.70 ± 5.89 km and a geometric albedo of 0.03 ± 0.01. By comparison, the MIPS photometer on the Spitzer Space Telescope gives a diameter of 145.44 ± 7.72 km and a geometric albedo of 0.03 ± 0.01. When the asteroid was observed occulting a star, the results showed a diameter of 148.00 ± 16.26 km.

Satellite 
A companion for 283 Emma was detected on 14 July 2003 by W. J. Merline et al. using the Keck II telescope and is designated S/2003 (283) 1. The announcement is contained in the International Astronomical Union Circular (IAUC) 8165. The satellite orbits at a semi-major axis of about 581 km with an eccentricity of 0.12. Emma has a hill sphere with a radius of about 28,000 km.

References

External links 
 Asteroids with Satellites, Robert Johnston, johnstonsarchive.net
 Orbits of Binary Asteroids with Adaptive Optics (VLT images)
 
 

000283
Discoveries by Auguste Charlois
Named minor planets
000283
000283
18890208